Palaeosiccia is a genus of moths in the subfamily Arctiinae erected by George Hampson in 1900.

Species
 Palaeosiccia honeyi Kühne, 2007
 Palaeosiccia major (Kiriakoff, 1958)
 Palaeosiccia punctata Hampson, 1900

References
Kühne, L. (2007). Esperiana Buchreihe zur Entomologie. Memoir 3: 353–394.

Lithosiini
Moth genera